Virumaa (Low German: Wierland; Old Norse: Virland) is a former independent county in Ancient Estonia. Now it is divided into Ida-Viru County or Eastern Vironia and Lääne-Viru County or Western Vironia. Vironians built many strongholds, like Tarwanpe (modern Rakvere) and Agelinde (now Punamägi Hill in Äntu village).

Vironian was divided into five clans (kilikunda), Maum (in Estonian "Mahu"), Laemund  (Lemmu) also known as Pudiviru, Askele, Revele (Rebala), Alentagh (Alutaguse). Like other Estonian tribes, Vironians remained predominantly pagan before Northern Crusades in the 13th century.

History 

According to the Livonian Chronicle of Henry, Vironians believed that Tharapita, a god worshipped by Osilians (the tribe inhabiting Saaremaa) was born in Vironia. However, Vironian elder Thabelin of Pudiviru had endorsed Christianity before the German and Danish crusaders reached Estonia. Thabelin (Tabellinus) was baptized by Germans in Gotland island. Later, when competing Danish crusaders arrived to Vironia, Thabelin was suspected of being too pro-German and hanged.

In 1219, the German crusaders of the Livonian Brothers of the Sword made a raid against Vironians together with recently christened Letts, Livonians, and several proto-Estonian tribes (Sakalians, Ugaunians and Jervians). After five days of killing and pillaging, Kyriavan, Thabelin and other Vironian elders asked for a truce. According to the chronicle, Kyriavan told he had a "very bad god" before and therefore was ready to accept the Christian god. After truce was made, Vironian elders accepted Christianity. Some sons of elders from all five Vironian clans were taken hostages by the crusaders as part of the truce. In 1221, Vironians took part in failed attempt to oust Danes who had built a fortress in the place of modern Tallinn in the neighboring province of Revelia. Danes retaliated, killed several Vironian elders and put Vironians under heavy taxes.

In 1225, Danes and German crusaders clashed with each other over the ownership of Vironia. In 1226, The papal legate William of Modena arrived to Vironian stronghold of Tarwanpe and mediated peace between Germans, Danes and Estonians. A year later the Vironian territories were taken by Brothers of the Sword. Vironians sided with the new Papal Legate Baldwin of Alna who in 1230 tried to create a Papal Vassal State in Northern Estonia, including Vironia. In 1233, the supporters of Baldwin were defeated by the Order in the city of Reval (Tallinn). Vironian territories were snatched by the Order again as Baldwin of Alna complained in his report to the Pope in 1234. The Order was also accused of oppressing Vironian converts and expelling local supporters of Church.

In 1238, Vironia was given to Denmark again according to the Treaty of Stensby. The area went into hands of powerful vassals of Danish king, many of which were of local origin, like Dietrich of Kievel (probably 'Kivela' - 'land of stone' in Estonian) who controlled Eastern part of Vironia, where he started to build the stronghold of Narva. Vironians and Vironian vassals took part in Order's and Denmark's failed crusade against Novgorod Republic 1240-1242. The names Virumaa, Vironia and Virland have been continuously used for the North-Eastern Estonia. For example, in 1266, Margaret Sambiria, Dowager Queen of Denmark was named the Lady of Estonia and Virland.

Parishes 
Maum (Mahu)
Laemund (Lemmu, also known as Pudiviru)
Askælæ (Äskälä)
Repel (Rebala)
Alentagh (Alutaguse)

See also 

Danish Estonia
Kunda culture
Livonian Crusade
Vironians
List of Estonian rulers

References

External links 
The flag of Vironia (see: Vironia)

Ancient counties of Estonia
Ida-Viru County
Lääne-Viru County